M. L. A. Yedukondalu is a 1983 Telugu film directed by Dasari Narayana Rao starring him in the eponymous role. The film was a critical and commercial success. It was remade in Hindi in 1984 as Aaj Ka M.L.A. Ram Avtar

Cast 

Dasari Narayana Rao as M. L. A. Yedukondalu

Soundtrack

Awards
 National Film Award for Best Female Playback Singer - P. Susheela (1984)
 Nandi Award for Best Dialogue Writer - Dasari Narayana Rao (1983)

References

External links

1983 films
Films directed by Dasari Narayana Rao
Telugu films remade in other languages